Lamban is a traditional dessert for the Bruneian Malay people, Kedayan in Labuan and in the states of Sabah, Malaysia. The taste of Lamban is almost like the Malays ketupat or the Chinese's rice dumplings and kelupis of Lun Bawang / Lundayeh.

See also 
 Kelupis

References 

Glutinous rice dishes
Bruneian cuisine
Malaysian cuisine
Rice dishes